Amolops viridimaculatus, also known as green-spotted torrent frog, Dahaoping sucker frog, and Dahaoping cascade frog, is a species of frog found in Yunnan, China, northern Vietnam, northern Myanmar, and Nagaland, Northeast India; it is also expected to occur in northern Laos.

Male frogs measure  and females  in length.

A. viridimaculatus is becoming rare due to habitat loss caused by small-scale agriculture and dam development.

References

viridimaculatus
Frogs of China
Frogs of India
Amphibians of Myanmar
Amphibians of Vietnam
Fauna of Yunnan
Amphibians described in 1983